{{DISPLAYTITLE:C5H5NS}}
The molecular formula C5H5NS (molar mass: 111.16 g/mol, exact mass: 111.0143 u) may refer to:

 2-Mercaptopyridine
 Thiazepines
 1,2-Thiazepine
 1,3-Thiazepine
 1,4-Thiazepine

Molecular formulas